The parachuting tournaments in air sports at the 2009 World Games in Kaohsiung was played between 17 and 21 July. 109 parachuters, from 22 nations, participated in the tournament. The parachuting competition took place in Kaohsiung Metropolitan Park.

Participating nations

Medal table

Events

References

External links
 Fédération Aéronautique Internationale
 Air sports on IWGA website
 Results

 
2009 World Games
2009